The 1999 NCAA Division II football season, part of college football in the United States organized by the National Collegiate Athletic Association at the Division II level, began on August 28, 1999, and concluded with the NCAA Division II Football Championship on December 11, 1999, at Braly Municipal Stadium in Florence, Alabama, hosted by the University of North Alabama.

Northwest Missouri State defeated Carson–Newman in the championship game, 58–52 after four overtimes, to win their second Division II national title.

The Harlon Hill Trophy was awarded to Corte McGuffey, quarterback from Northern Colorado.

Conference changes and new programs

Conference changes
The Midwest Intercollegiate Football Conference transferred its football sponsorship, and 13 of its 14 members, back to the Great Lakes Intercollegiate Athletic Conference after the two leagues merged prior the season. The MIFC was then dissolved and GLIAC resumed its football championship for the first since 1990.

Program changes
After Mankato State University changed its name to Minnesota State University, Mankato in 1999, the Mankato State Mavericks became the Minnesota State–Mankato Mavericks.

Conference standings

Conference summaries

Postseason

The 1999 NCAA Division II Football Championship playoffs were the 26th single-elimination tournament to determine the national champion of men's NCAA Division II college football. The championship game was held at Braly Municipal Stadium in Florence, Alabama, for the 13th time.

Playoff bracket

See also
 1999 NCAA Division I-A football season
 1999 NCAA Division I-AA football season
 1999 NCAA Division III football season
 1999 NAIA football season

References